Panther Hollow is a small, somewhat isolated neighborhood at the bottom of Joncaire Street in Junction Hollow that runs along Boundary Street and is located in the Central Oakland section of Pittsburgh, Pennsylvania. The neighborhood was settled in late 19th century mostly by Italian immigrants from Pizzoferrato and Gamberale, Italy. Even today, park benches and picnic tables in the neighborhood are painted in the red, white, and green of the Italian flag and a sign post marks the distance to the two Italian cities from which most of the original residents arrived. Among its most famous such residents was Pittsburgh boxing legend Mose Butch. A remembrance memorial in the neighborhood, dedicated on December 2, 2007, commemorates the original 95 families that first settled in the neighborhood.

See also
 Panther Hollow Lake
 Panther Hollow Bridge

References

External links

  Schenley Park website
 Panther Hollow Bridge at pghbridges.com
 
 Names of the families and plaque

Video
WQED feature on Panther Hollow

Italian-American culture in Pittsburgh
Parks in Pittsburgh
Neighborhoods in Pittsburgh